The Caucasian shrew (Sorex satunini) is a species of mammal in the family Soricidae. It is found in Armenia, Russia and Turkey.

References

 Insectivore Specialist Group 1996.  Sorex satunini.   2006 IUCN Red List of Threatened Species.   Downloaded on 30 July 2007.

Sorex
Taxonomy articles created by Polbot
Mammals described in 1922